Selenoprotein T, also known as SELT, is a protein that in humans is encoded by the SELT gene.

Gene 

The selenocysteine is encoded by the UGA codon that normally signals translation termination. The 3' UTR of selenoprotein genes have a common stem-loop structure, the sec insertion sequence (SECIS), that is necessary for the recognition of UGA as a Sec codon rather than as a stop signal.

Protein structure 

Selenoprotein T  contains a selenocysteine (Sec) residue at its active site.

See also 
 selenoprotein

References

Further reading

Selenoproteins